Esperança e Brunhais (officially, União das Freguesias de Esperança e Brunhais) is a Portuguese freguesia in the Municipality of Póvoa de Lanhoso, it has an area of 7.12 km2 and 652 inhabitants as of 2011. It was created during the administrative reorganization of 2012/2013, from the aggregation of the former parishes of Esperança and Brunhais.

References 

Freguesias of Póvoa de Lanhoso